Finrozole is an aromatase (CYP19A1) inhibitor.

References

Aromatase inhibitors
Nitriles
Triazoles
Fluoroarenes